The Blue Cockatoo was a restaurant in Cheyne Walk, Chelsea, London, at the corner with Oakley Street. It is considered to have been England's first bistro.

The restaurant and its upper room was popular with artists, including Charles Rennie Mackintosh and his wife, Margaret Macdonald Mackintosh, who had studios in nearby Glebe Place from 1915. Other regulars included Augustus John, Randolph Schwabe, John Duncan Fergusson, and Margaret Morris although the food itself "was often unappetizing and the service erratic". Others included Eric Gill in 1927.

In 1962–1967, The Blue Cockatoo along with the Pier Hotel was sold to developers Wates Group to be replaced by "luxury flats". The block of flats is called Pier House, and a statue of A Boy on a Dolphin stands at the front.

References

Restaurants in London
Chelsea, London
Defunct restaurants in London